Now Bandegan District is a district (bakhsh) in Fasa County, Fars Province, Iran. At the 2006 census, its population was 11,679, in 2,858 families.  The District has one city: Now Bandegan. The District has one rural district (dehestan): Now Bandegan Rural District.

References 

Fasa County
Districts of Fars Province